Nelson Timóteo Alves Sardinha (born June 28, 1966 in Luanda) is a retired Angolan basketball player.  A 6’6”, 209-pound Center, he competed for Angola at the 1990 FIBA World Championship and 1992 Olympic Games, while winning two African titles in 1989 and 1992.

References

External links
 
Basketball Reference Profile
Sports-Reference Profile
RealGM Profile

1966 births
Living people
Basketball players from Luanda
Angolan men's basketball players
1990 FIBA World Championship players
Olympic basketball players of Angola
Basketball players at the 1992 Summer Olympics
Centers (basketball)
C.D. Primeiro de Agosto men's basketball players